Grasshopper is a novel by Barbara Vine, pseudonym of author Ruth Rendell, first published in 2000.

Reception 
The Guardian stated that "Vine's great talent is in making sure that we care" but that "When it comes to the animate, however, Vine's touch is sometimes less sure." Entertainment Weekly rated it an A−, writing that "As do all Barbara Vine novels, the well-wrought mystery Grasshopper has a lot lurking below its carefully composed surface".

References

2000 British novels
Novels by Ruth Rendell
Works published under a pseudonym
Novels set in London
Viking Press books